DeathTrack is a first-person, futuristic racing game developed for MS-DOS by Dynamix and published by Activision in 1989.

Gameplay
There are two ways to win a race: be the first to finish the race, or be the only one to finish the race. Based in a futuristic America, the player races on various tracks across the country for money, which can be spent on armor, weapons and other modifications to protect and use against the competition. There are ten tracks in ten cities. The track for each city is unique, as is each opponent's 3D polygonal car.

The player chooses from one of three cars (either "The Hellcat" for high speed, "The Crusher" for high firepower or "The Pitbull" for heavy armor) and begins racing against other drivers. The player starts with $10,000 to spend on weapons, and earns more money by winning races. For each item the player buys, there are three variants: small/ineffective, medium/good and large/best.

Reception
Computer Gaming World called DeathTrack "an outstanding new action game ... gratuitous violence at its therapeutic best", praising the graphics.

In 1996, Computer Gaming World declared Deathtrack the 124th-best computer game ever released.

Legacy
A Game Boy version was in the works by game developer Argonaut Software, but was unreleased.

A sequel, Death Track: Resurrection, was released on February 22, 2008, in Russia, then later released in North America and Europe. An Xbox 360 version of the game was expected to be released later in 2009.

References

External links

1989 video games
Activision games
DOS games
DOS-only games
Racing video games
Racing video games set in the United States
Vehicular combat games
Video games scored by Russell Lieblich
Single-player video games
Dynamix games
Video games developed in the United States